The Acle Straight, also known as the Acle New Road is a major road between Acle and Great Yarmouth in Norfolk. It is part of the A47 trunk road.

History
The road was originally proposed as a turnpike on 3 May 1830 following an Act of Parliament and engineered by William Thorold. Its purpose was to provide quicker access between the two towns over the Halvergate Marshes. It was designed as two straight sections, connected by a bend halfway along which included a branch road between Seven Mile House and Halvergate. The road was constructed by digging two parallel ditches,  feet apart, with a surface comprising brushwood, gravel and soil from the ditches. It was largely complete by April 1831 and opened later that year.

Tolls were removed from the road in 1861, though they remained on the Yarmouth Suspension Bridge over the River Bure into the town centre until 1920.

In 1882, the railway line between Acle and Great Yarmouth was built parallel to the Acle Straight. The Stracey Arms Windpump was built in 1883 near the Halvergate branch road junction. It was Grade II* listed in 1982. A similarly named pub, the Stracey Arms, opened next door to the windmill. It subsequently became popular with boaters on the Norfolk Broads as it sat directly between the Acle Straight and the River Bure and had private moorings. In 2015, it was converted into a Hindu temple.

The Acle Straight experienced problems with subsidence.

Traffic
The road is a notorious accident spot, with numerous fatalities. There have been proposals to widen the road to dual carriageway, but these have been rejected owing to environmental concerns.

Cultural references
Several ghost stories have featured the Acle Straight. A driver passing the turning to the Halvergate branch spotted a man walking out into the middle of the road. Unable to stop, he drove straight through him. There have also been reports of a horse and cart crossing directly in front of oncoming traffic, and drivers have reported wanting to perform an emergency stop for no reason.

The Acle Straight is mentioned in the song "Stuck In A Rut" by local band The Darkness. The lyrics refer to the group trying to get out of their hometown of Lowestoft, with the road as one possible escape route.

References

Roads in Norfolk
Turnpike roads in the United Kingdom